Takuma Koga (born April 16, 1977) is a Japanese professional stock car racing driver who competes full-time in the ARCA Menards Series West, driving the No. 7 Toyota Camry for Jerry Pitts Racing as well as part-time in the NASCAR Xfinity Series, driving the No. 13 Toyota Supra for MBM Motorsports.

Racing career

Koga began competing in NASCAR in 2001 in the NASCAR Northwest Series, where he attempted six races, qualifying for five and failing to qualify for one. After competing in partial K&N West Series schedules between 2002 and 2016, Koga ran his first full season in 2017. That year, he also scored a career-best fifth-place finish at Orange Show Speedway. In December 2018, Koga announced he would be joining Performance P-1 Motorsports for the 2019 season. He remained with the team for the 2020 season in the renamed ARCA Menards Series West. Koga left Performance P-1 for the 2021 season, and joined Jerry Pitts Racing to drive their No. 7 car full-time, which switched from Ford to Toyota starting that year. The team was formerly Jefferson Pitts Racing before the team's two co-owners, Jeff Jefferson and Jerry Pitts, split up to each have their separate teams.

On February 21, 2022, an article from Yahoo! Japan revealed that Koga would attempt to make his Xfinity Series debut at some point in 2022, driving for MBM Motorsports. Due to COVID-19 travel restrictions from Japan to the United States, the race he will run has yet to be determined.

Motorsports career results

ARCA Menards Series
(key) (Bold – Pole position awarded by qualifying time. Italics – Pole position earned by points standings or practice time. * – Most laps led.)

ARCA Menards Series West

 Season still in progress

References

External links
 Official NASCAR Bio
 
 

Living people
NASCAR drivers
Japanese racing drivers
Sportspeople from Nagoya
1977 births
ARCA Menards Series drivers